Shahzadeh Ebrahim (also Romanized as Shāhzādeh Ebrāhīm) is a village in Kahak Rural District, Kahak District, Qom County, Qom Province, Iran. At the 2006 census, its population was 129, in 44 families.

References 

Populated places in Qom Province